Gloria! is the eighth studio album released by Cuban-American singer-songwriter Gloria Estefan, released on June 2, 1998, by Epic Records.

Background
Gloria! is a dance and house album which was a departure from Estefan's previous works. Though dance elements had been featured in previous recordings, this was her first album to consist entirely of upbeat club music. The project initially began as a remix album before being expanded to an entirely new record.

The album spawned four singles and one promotional single. "Heaven's What I Feel" was released as the first single from the album and peaked at number 27 on the Billboard Hot 100. "Oye!" was released as the second single from the album, however, its release as a physical single was canceled in the United States. The song peaked at number 1 on the Hot Dance Music/Club Play, Hot Latin Tracks, and the Latin Tropical/Salsa Airplay charts. "Don't Let This Moment End" was released as the third single from the album and peaked at number 76 on the Billboard Hot 100. In Spain, "Cuba Libre" was released as a fourth single and "Don't Stop" was released promotionally. Though they did not feature any tracks from Gloria!, the extended plays "Bailando!" and "Partytime!" were released exclusively at Target stores as a form of promotion for the album.

Several nominations were received for the album's singles. "Heaven's What I Feel" received a Grammy Music Award nomination for "Best Dance Recording", as did "Don't Let This Moment End" the following year. Estefan received a Grammy nomination for "Best Video, Long Form" for the album's supplementary DVD Don't Stop!. Estefan received the Billboard Latin Music Award for "Best Latin Dance Club Play Track of the Year" for "Oye!" and received an Alma Award for the music video for "Heaven's What I Feel".

Critical reception
A reviewer from The Atlanta Journal-Constitution wrote, "Gloria!" successfully merges Estefan's high-energy urges with today's top dance mix masters. The result is a nonstop dance workout as all the Latin-flavored tracks segue into one another."

Track listing

Charts

Weekly charts

Year-end charts

Certifications and sales

Accolades

Release history

References

1998 albums
Gloria Estefan albums
Dance music albums by American artists
Albums produced by Emilio Estefan